In 2021, the population of the city of Ottawa was 1,017,449. The population of the census metropolitan area, Ottawa-Gatineau, was 1,488,307.

Population history

Age and sex 
In 2001, females made up 51.2% of the amalgamated Ottawa population, while the median age of the population was 36.7 years of age. Youths under 15 years of age comprised 18.9% of the total population, while those of retirement age (65 years and older) comprised 11.4%.

Migration and immigration 
Between 1987 and 2002, 131,816 individuals relocated to the city, which represents 75% of the population growth for that period. Foreign immigration plays a significant role in Ottawa's population growth. Foreign born residents make up 23.4 percent of Ottawa's population, in which many come from the United Kingdom, China, India, the United States, Lebanon, Pakistan, Somalia, Iran, the Philippines, Vietnam, Democratic Republic of the Congo, and Haiti.

Languages 
The Algonquian languages have been spoken for centuries by the Indigenous peoples and subsequently by the coureurs des bois and voyageurs of the Ottawa valley during the 1600s and 1700s. Starting in the mid-1800s, Irish settlers of the Ottawa valley develop a distinct dialect referred to as "Ottawa Valley Twang". Traces of "Valley Twang" although rare, can still be heard in the valley's more isolated areas.

The city offers municipal services in both of Canada's official languages (Canadian English and Canadian French). 367,035 people, or 36.45% of Ottawa's population, can speak both languages.  As such it is the largest city in Canada where municipal services are offered in both English and French. However, the city is not officially bilingual in law.  Those who identify their mother tongue as English constitute 58.18 percent, while those with 
French as their mother tongue make up 12.52 percent of the population. In terms of respondents' knowledge of one or both official languages, 60.60 percent and 1.42 percent of the population have knowledge of English only and French only, respectively; while 37.2 percent have knowledge of both official languages. An additional 23.06 percent list languages other than English and French as their mother tongue.  These include Arabic (4.33%), Chinese (3.32%), Spanish (1.4%), Italian (0.79%), and many others.

Ethnicity

City of Ottawa 
 
Members of visible minority groups (non-white/European) constitute 32.5 percent, while those of Indigenous origin make up 2.6% of the total population. The largest visible minority groups are: Black Canadians: 8.5%, Arab Canadians: 5.8%, South Asian Canadians: 5.8%, and Chinese Canadians: 4.6%. Smaller groups include Southeast Asians, Filipinos, Latin Americans, and West Asians.

Note: Totals greater than 100% due to multiple origin responses.

Metro Ottawa 

Note: Totals greater than 100% due to multiple origin responses.

Religion 
In the 2021 Canadian Census, 52.8% of the population belonged to Christian denominations, down from 65.4% in 2011. Catholics were the most common at 30.4%, down from 38.4% in 2011. Protestants were 11.4% of the population (19.5% in 2011), while Christian orthodox were 2.1% and Christians of no specified denomination were 6.4%. Other Christian/Christian related traditions (Including Mormons and Jehovah's Witnesses) made up 2.5%. Non-Christian religions are also very well established in Ottawa, the largest being Islam: 9.9% (6.7% in 2011), Hinduism: 2% (1.4% in 2011), Buddhism: 1.2% (1.3% in 2011), and Judaism: 1.1% (1.2% in 2011.) Residents with no religion and/or secular perspectives make up 31.6% of Ottawa's population, up from 21.8% in 2011.

Populations per neighbourhood (old City of Ottawa)
The following are populations of neighbourhoods that generally correspond to Statistics Canada census tracts.

Notes

References

Ottawa
Ottawa